Minuscule 743 (in the Gregory-Aland numbering), α1401 Aν414Nι40 (von Soden), is a Greek minuscule manuscript of the New Testament written on paper. Palaeographically it has been assigned to the 14th century. The manuscript has no complex contents. Scrivener labelled it as 738e.

Description 

The codex contains the text of the Gospel of John, 1-3 Epistles of John, Revelation of John on 401 paper leaves (size ), with one lacuna (John 21:22-25). According to Gregory it has 406 leaves.

The text is written in one column per page, 35 lines per page.

Gospel of John has a commentary of Nicetas, Revelation of John has a commentary of Andreas. Epistles of John are without a commentary.

Text 

Aland the Greek text of the codex did not place in any Category.

In John 2:1 it reads τριτη ημερα (third day) for ημερα τη τριτη (the third day); the reading is supported by manuscripts: Codex Vaticanus, Codex Nanianus, Koridethi, manuscripts of Ferrar Family, minuscule 196.

In John 4:51 it reads υιος (son) for παις (servant), the reading of the codex is supported by Codex Bezae, Codex Cyprius, Codex Petropolitanus Purpureus, Nanianus, Codex Petropolitanus, 0141, 33, 194, 196, 817, 892, 1192, 1216, 1241.

History 

F. H. A. Scrivener - followed Martin - dated the manuscript to the 13th century; Gregory dated it to the 14th century. The manuscript is currently dated by the INTF to the 14th century.

The manuscript was added to the list of New Testament manuscripts by Scrivener (738) and Gregory (743). It was examined and described by Paulin Martin. Gregory saw the manuscript in 1885.

Herman C. Hoskier collated text of the Apocalypse. It was examined by J. Schmid.

The manuscript is now housed at the Bibliothèque nationale de France (Suppl. Gr. 159, fol. 2-7.12-406) in Paris.

See also 

 List of New Testament minuscules
 Biblical manuscript
 Textual criticism

References

Further reading 

 
 Herman C. Hoskier, Concerning the Text of the Apocalypse: Collation of All Existing Available Greek Documents with the Standard Text of Stephen’s Third Edition Together with the Testimony of Versions, Commentaries and Fathers. 1 vol. (London: Bernard Quaritch, Ltd., 1929), p. 423

Greek New Testament minuscules
14th-century biblical manuscripts
Bibliothèque nationale de France collections